St James is a locality within the City of Sydney, centred on St. James' Church on King Street. The locality includes much of Hyde Park, those parts of the city from Elizabeth Street through to Macquarie Street.

St James' railway station was opened in 1926 as part of the City Railway. It is an underground station, constructed below Hyde Park. The station was the first electric railway service to enter an Australian city centre. The station is part of the Sydney Trains network, offering direct services to Kingsford Smith (Sydney) Airport.

David Jones' used the name "St. James" as its private label in the second half of the twentieth century, reflecting the location of the main store on Elizabeth Street (opened in 1927).

References

Sydney localities